Mirjeta Bajramoska (born 22 November 1984 in Bitola, Socialist Republic of Macedonia) is a Macedonian handball player who plays for ŽRK Vardar and for the North Macedonia women's national handball team. 

She plays in left back position.

In the season 2009/10, playing for ŽRK Metalurg, she was top scorer in the Challenge Cup scoring 69 goals.

Individual awards
 Top Scorer of the Baia Mare Champions Trophy: 2014

References

1984 births
Living people
Macedonian female handball players
Sportspeople from Bitola